Tax rebate discounting is a process in Canada where a tax preparation firm purchases the right to the anticipated tax rebate in exchange for a percentage of the rebate amount. Canada Revenue Agency (CRA) rules  establish the maximum discounting fee at 15% of the first 300 C$ ($45) plus 5% of any remaining refund.  No other fees for preparation or filing the return are permitted. The discount works out to a high effective interest rate.  However, in some cases the discount is comparable to, or cheaper than, the firm's fee for preparing an ordinary tax return.

Tax rebate discounting in Canada is regulated under the Tax Rebate Discounting Act.  All discounters must be registered with the CRA and comply with all requirements for record-keeping.

This process is somewhat similar to a refund anticipation loan in the United States.

References

Taxation in Canada